One West Waikiki is an American crime drama television series that aired on CBS from August 4, 1994 until September 8, 1994, and then in first-run syndication for its second season from October 15, 1995 until May 25, 1996.  The series was set in Hawaii, and starred Cheryl Ladd and Richard Burgi.

The program was created by Glen A. Larson. The New York Times reported that the show's producers sought a summer slot in order to raise money for filming more episodes because "They had already sold the idea of the program to international broadcasters".

Plot
Dr. Dawn "Holli" Holliday (Cheryl Ladd), a forensics expert formerly of the Los Angeles Coroner's Office is appointed as the Hawaiian Police Department's medical examiner. She finds herself at odds with Lt. Mack Wolfe (Richard Burgi), Honolulu PD's No.1 homicide detective. They have a love-hate relationship yet they must cooperate in order to solve various crimes.

Cast
 Cheryl Ladd as Dr. Dawn "Holli" Holliday
 Richard Burgi as Lt. Mack Wolfe
 Elsie Sniffen as Nui Shaw
 Ogie Zulueta as Kimo
 Paul Gleason as Captain Dave Herzog

Filming and distribution
Most of the series was filmed at Hawaii Film Studio at Diamond Head, but episodes were also filmed in San Diego, American Samoa, and New Zealand. Episodes were broadcast in Canada, Europe, New Zealand, and Singapore.

Episodes

Series overview

Season 1 (1994)

Season 2 (1995–96)

References

External links
 
 

1994 American television series debuts
1996 American television series endings
1990s American crime drama television series
Television shows set in Hawaii
Television shows filmed in Hawaii
Television shows filmed in American Samoa
Television shows filmed in California
Television shows filmed in New Zealand
English-language television shows
Television series by CBS Studios
Television series created by Glen A. Larson
First-run syndicated television programs in the United States